The Los Angeles Angels were a professional baseball team based in Los Angeles that played in the "near-major league" Pacific Coast League (PCL) from 1903 through 1957.

The Angels were formed in 1903 as charter members of the PCL. In 1958, they were forced to move to a smaller market as a result of the Brooklyn Dodgers' move to Los Angeles, which brought Major League Baseball competition into the PCL's territory. The franchise relocated to Spokane, Washington, as the Spokane Indians.

The 1903, 1934, and 1943 Angels were recognized as being among the 100 greatest minor league teams of all time. The 1934 team, with a 137–50 record, was ranked as the number one minor league team.

Team history

From 1903 through 1957, the Los Angeles Angels, a PCL team, were one of the mainstays of the Pacific Coast League, winning the PCL pennant 12 times. The Angels, along with the Portland Beavers, Oakland Oaks, Sacramento Solons, San Francisco Seals, and Seattle Indians were charter members of the Pacific Coast League which was founded in 1903.

From 1903 through 1925, the team played at 15,000-seat Washington Park (also known as Chutes Park), just south of downtown Los Angeles. Both the team and the park were founded by James Furlong "Jim" Morley (1869–1940), an entrepreneur involved in bowling, prize fighting, billiards, and gemstones as well as baseball.

During this time, the Angels (or Looloos or Seraphs as they were sometimes called), won pennants in 1903, 1905, 1907, 1908, 1916, 1918, and 1921. In 1918, the team finished second in regular season play, but won the postseason series against their cross-town rivals at the time, the Vernon Tigers.  From 1915 to 1921, the Angels were owned by John F. "Johnny" Powers,  Los Angeles socialite.  The 1916 team was managed by Frank Chance, baseball Hall of Famer, noted as part of "Tinker to Evers to Chance."

In 1921, the team was purchased by chewing-gum magnate William Wrigley Jr., the owner of the Chicago Cubs of the National League. When Wrigley could not get the city of Los Angeles to make the improvements to Washington Park he requested, he began construction of his own 21,000-seat stadium, appropriately named Wrigley Field, at 42nd Place and Avalon Boulevard in what is now known as South Central Los Angeles. The Angels began play at Wrigley in 1926, and responded by winning their eighth PCL pennant, 10½ games ahead of the second-place Oakland Oaks. The stadium was best known as the venue for the 1960 TV show Home Run Derby, filmed in December 1959.

The Seraphs won the pennant again in 1933, and they fielded what is regarded as one of the greatest teams in the history of baseball in 1934. They were so good that their opponent in the postseason series (which the Angels won) was an all-star team composed of players from the other seven PCL teams.

The team won pennants in 1938, 1943, 1944, and 1947, with the 1943 team being considered among the best in league history. For the next eight years, however, the Angels struggled to remain mediocre at best. In 1949, the Seraphs finished in last place, for only the third time in 47 years. Then, after finishing third in 1955, the Angels won what would be their last pennant in the PCL in 1956. Led by their portly, popular first baseman Steve Bilko, the Seraphs finished , sixteen games ahead of the runner-up Seattle Rainiers. Their manager was Bob Scheffing, who later managed the Detroit Tigers and Chicago Cubs.

Area rivals
In 1909, the PCL added two teams to become a six-team league (in 1919 it added two more). One of the new teams was located in the nearby town of Vernon, and the Angels had their first cross-town rival in the Vernon Tigers. Vernon, a small town, was one of only two cities in Los Angeles County that had legalized the sale of alcohol—with alcoholic beverages as an attraction, the Tigers attracted big crowds by the standards of the day, and won three pennants during their 17-year history. In 1919,  the Tigers were purchased by Roscoe "Fatty" Arbuckle. Opening day in 1919 featured a preliminary "game" which included Arbuckle, Tom Mix, and Buster Keaton. With the ratification of the 18th Amendment and the criminalizing of alcohol consumption, however, crowds became sparse and the Tigers were sold to San Francisco interests and moved there for the 1926 season.

The move of the Tigers prompted the owner of the Salt Lake Bees to move his team to Los Angeles for the 1926 season, where the team began play as the Hollywood Bees, but soon changed their name to the Hollywood Stars. This first version of the Stars, though supposedly representing Hollywood, actually played home games as tenants of the Angels at Wrigley Field. Though the Stars won pennants in 1929 and 1930, they never developed much of a fan base. They were merely a team to watch when the Angels were on the road. After the 1935 season, the Angels doubled the Stars’ rent, whereupon the Stars moved to San Diego for the 1936 season, becoming the San Diego Padres, and Los Angeles became a one-team city once more for the 1936 and 1937 seasons.

In 1938, the old Vernon Tigers, who had played in San Francisco as the Mission Reds since 1926, moved back to Los Angeles, this time as the second version of the Hollywood Stars and, like their predecessors, played their 1938 home games in Wrigley Field. After one season, though, the team was sold to new owners, among them Robert H. Cobb, owner of the Brown Derby restaurant and for whom the Cobb salad is named. They sold stock in the team to movie stars, movie moguls, and Hollywood civic leaders. Moreover, the team actually played in the Hollywood area, beginning in 1939 when Gilmore Field was opened in the Fairfax District adjacent to Hollywood.

The new Stars (or "Twinks") caught on and became a very popular team, winning three pennants before 1958. They were genuine rivals to the Angels, and it was not uncommon for fights between the teams to break out during games. In fact, on August 2, 1953, a brawl between the two teams lasted 30 minutes, broken up only when 50 riot police were sent to Gilmore Field by Chief of Police William Parker, who was at home watching the game on television when the fight started.

The beginning of the end
Early in 1957, Philip Wrigley, who had inherited the team from his father, sold the Angels and Wrigley Field to Brooklyn Dodgers owner Walter O'Malley for the then-astronomical sum of $3,000,000 ($ today) and ownership of the Fort Worth Panthers of the Texas League. O'Malley assured the PCL owners that he intended to operate the Angels as a PCL team, as had the Wrigleys. He kept his promise – for only one season. The ownership of the minor league team also gave O'Malley exclusive rights to major league baseball in Los Angeles, and he used this to relocate the Dodgers.

After the 1957 season, the Angels and the Stars were relocated when the Dodgers confirmed their long-rumored move to Los Angeles for the 1958 season. The Angels relocated to Spokane, Washington, where they continued as the Spokane Indians in 1958. The Stars, in a sense, "returned" to Salt Lake City (whence the original Stars had moved in 1926), becoming the Salt Lake City Bees once more.

The new Los Angeles Dodgers would adopt the interlocking "LA" cap logo of the Angels, with a color change to Dodger Blue and white.

After Los Angeles
After Los Angeles, the franchise had stays in Spokane, Washington, (Indians, 1958–1971) and Albuquerque, New Mexico, (where it assumed the name Dukes, a venerable baseball franchise name in the "Duke City") from 1972 to 2000. The franchise was sold and became the third incarnation of the Portland Beavers 

In 2010, the franchise was purchased by San Diego Padres' principal owner Jeff Moorad, after the Portland City Council chose to renovate PGE Park as a soccer-only facility for the Portland Timbers of Major League Soccer rather than continue as a joint-use baseball and soccer stadium. The franchise was temporarily relocated to Tucson, Arizona, for the 2011 season as the Tucson Padres. Moorad intended to have the team play in Escondido, a suburb northeast of San Diego, starting in 2013; however, those plans fell through. After three seasons in Tucson, they moved in 2014 to El Paso, Texas, and became the El Paso Chihuahuas.

On May 26, 2012, the MLB Los Angeles Angels wore the PCL franchise's 1950s uniforms during a game at Safeco Field against the Seattle Mariners, as part of the Mariners' turn back the clock 1950s game.

Affiliations
The Angels were affiliated with the following major league teams:

Notable Angels with MLB experience

Notes

References 

Richard Beverage, The Los Angeles Angels of the Pacific Coast League: A History, 1903–1957. McFarland & Company, Inc., Jefferson, North Carolina, 2011. .
O'Neal, Bill. The Pacific Coast League 1903–1988. Eakin Press, Austin TX, 1990. .
Snelling, Dennis. The Pacific Coast League: A Statistical History, 1903–1957. McFarland & Company, Inc., Jefferson, North Carolina, 1995. .

External links

Baseball Reference
Los Angeles Angels, 1900-1909

 
Baseball teams established in 1903
Baseball teams disestablished in 1957
Defunct Pacific Coast League teams
Angels
Chicago Cubs minor league affiliates
Brooklyn Dodgers minor league affiliates
Defunct baseball teams in California
1903 establishments in California
1957 disestablishments in California